Christopher Brewer (born January 23, 1962) is a former American football running back who played two seasons in the National Football League with the Denver Broncos and Chicago Bears. He was drafted by the Broncos in the ninth round of the 1984 NFL Draft. He played college football at the University of Arizona and attended George Washington High School in Denver, Colorado. Brewer was also a member of the Denver Dynamite and New England Steamrollers of the Arena Football League.

Professional career
Brewer was selected by the Arizona Wranglers in the 1984 USFL Territorial Draft.

Denver Broncos
Brewer was selected by the Denver Broncos with the 245th pick in the 1984 NFL Draft and played in thirteen games for the team during the 1984 season. He was released by the Broncos on September 2, 1985.

In May 1986, the Arizona Outlaws traded Brewers' USFL rights to the Memphis Showboats.

Denver Dynamite
Brewer played for the Denver Dynamite during the 1987 season, earning First-team All-Arena honors. The Dynamite won ArenaBowl I against the Pittsburgh Gladiators on August 1, 1987.

Chicago Bears
Brewer played in three games, starting one, for the Chicago Bears in 1987.

New England Steamrollers
Brewer played for the New England Steamrollers in 1988.

References

External links
Just Sports Stats
College stats

Living people
1962 births
Players of American football from Denver
American football fullbacks
American football linebackers
African-American players of American football
Arizona Wildcats football players
Denver Broncos players
Chicago Bears players
Denver Dynamite (arena football) players
New England Steamrollers players
National Football League replacement players
21st-century African-American people
20th-century African-American sportspeople